Harry Drake was an archer and bowyer.

Harry Drake may also refer to:

Harry Drake, character in Danger Island (serial)
Harry Drake, character in The Seven Pearls

See also
Henry Drake (disambiguation)